This is a list of people who have served as Lord Lieutenant of the County Palatine of Chester. Since 1689, all Lords Lieutenant have also been Custos Rotulorum of Cheshire.

Lord Lieutenants of Cheshire

Vice Lieutenants
Honourable Alan de Tatton Egerton, MP 11 January 1902
Sir George Dixon, Baronet 15 December 1920

Deputy Lieutenants

Thomas, Lord Newton 23 February 1901 
Colonel Sir Edward Cotton-Jodrell, KCB 23 February 1901

References

External links

Lord Lieutenant of Cheshire

Cheshire
Local government in Cheshire
Lord-Lieutenants of Cheshire